In mathematical logic, Gödel's β function is a function used to permit quantification over finite sequences of natural numbers in formal theories of arithmetic. The β function is used, in particular, in showing that the class of arithmetically definable functions is closed under primitive recursion, and therefore includes all primitive recursive functions.

The  β function was introduced  without the name in the proof of the first of Gödel's incompleteness theorems (Gödel 1931). The  β function lemma given below is an essential step of that proof. Gödel gave the  β function its name in (Gödel 1934).

Definition 

The  function takes three natural numbers as arguments. It is defined as

Properties 

The β function is arithmetically definable in an obvious way, because it uses only arithmetic operations and the remainder function which is arithmetically definable. It is therefore representable in Robinson arithmetic and stronger theories such as Peano arithmetic. By fixing the first two arguments appropriately, one can arrange that the values obtained by varying the final argument from 0 to n run through any specified (n+1)-tuple of natural numbers (the β lemma described in detail below). This allows simulating the quantification over sequences of natural numbers of arbitrary length, which cannot be done directly in the language of arithmetic, by quantification over just two numbers, to be used as the first two arguments of the β function.

For example, if f is a function defined by primitive recursion on a parameter n, say by f(0) = c and f(n+1) = g(n, f(n)), then to express f(n) = y one would like to say: there exists a sequence a0, a1, …, an such that a0 = c,  an = y and for all i < n one has g(i, ai) = ai+1. While that is not possible directly, one can say instead: there exist natural numbers a and b such that β(a,b,0) = c, β(a,b,n) = y and for all i < n one has g(i, β(a,b,i)) = β(a,b,i+1).

The β function lemma 

The utility of the β function comes from the following result (Gödel 1931, Hilfssatz 1, p.192-193), which is the purpose of the β function in Gödel's incompleteness proof. This result is explained in more detail than in Gödel's proof in (Mendelson 1997:186) and (Smith 2013:113-118).

 β function lemma. For any sequence of natural numbers (k0, k1, …, kn), there are natural numbers b and c such that, for every natural number 0  ≤  i ≤ n, β(b, c, i) = ki.

As an example, the sequence (2,0,2,1) can be encoded by b= and c=24, since 

The proof of the β function lemma makes use of the Chinese remainder theorem.

See also 
Gödel numbering for sequences
Gödel's incompleteness theorems
Diagonal lemma

References 

 in (Gödel 1986)
 Notes taken by Stpehen C. Kleene and John B. Rosser during lectures given at the Institute for Advanced Study. Reprinted in (Davis 1965)

Mathematical logic